The 1989 Suntory Japan Open Tennis Championships was a tennis tournament played on outdoor hard courts at the Ariake Coliseum in Tokyo in Japan that was part of the 1989 Nabisco Grand Prix and of Category 2 of the 1989 WTA Tour. The tournament was held from April 17 through April 23, 1989. Stefan Edberg and Kumiko Okamoto won the singles titles.

Finals

Men's singles

 Stefan Edberg defeated  Ivan Lendl 6–3, 2–6, 6–4
 It was Edberg's 1st singles title of the year and the 34th of his career.

Women's singles

 Kumiko Okamoto defeated  Elizabeth Smylie 6–4, 6–2
 It was Okamoto's only singles title of the year and the 1st of her career.

Men's doubles

 Ken Flach /  Robert Seguso defeated  Kevin Curren /  David Pate 7–6, 7–6
 It was Flach's 1st title of the year and the 25th of his career. It was Seguso's 1st title of the year and the 25th of his career.

Women's doubles

 Jill Hetherington /  Elizabeth Smylie defeated  Ann Henricksson /  Beth Herr 6–1, 6–3
 It was Hetherington's 3rd title of the year and the 9th of her career. It was Smylie's 3rd title of the year and the 24th of her career.

References

External links
 Official website
  Association of Tennis Professionals (ATP) tournament profile

Suntory Japan Open Tennis Championships
Suntory Japan Open Tennis Championships
Japan Open (tennis)
Suntory Japan Open Tennis Championships
Suntory Japan Open Tennis Championships